Manuel Barros Borgoño (1852–1903) was a Chilean physician.

Chilean physicians
1852 births
1903 deaths
People from Santiago